Decks, EFX & 909 is a 1999 compilation album by Canadian electronic music artist Richie Hawtin. It was created utilizing two turntables, an effects box, and a Roland TR-909 drum machine. Subsequently, followed by DE9: Closer to the Edit (2001) and DE9: Transitions (2005), it is the first entry in his DE9 series.

Critical reception

John Bush of AllMusic gave the album 5 stars out of 5, saying, "The result of Hawtin's obvious labor of love is a mix album that manages to be simultaneously intense and moody, pummeling yet restrained." Joshua Klein of The A.V. Club said, "even though his Detroit-indebted mix stays pretty subdued, it never gets boring." Amanda Nowinski of Billboard called it "a pure testament to the artist's passionate and innovative DJ style."

Track listing

References

External links
 
 

1999 compilation albums
Richie Hawtin albums
Novamute Records albums